John Arlington "Shotgun" Hargis (August 20, 1920 – January 2, 1986) was an American professional basketball player, first in the National Basketball League (NBL) and then in the National Basketball Association (NBA). He was born in Nacogdoches, Texas and attended Nacogdoches High School.

Hargis enrolled in the University of Texas at Austin in the early 1940s and played college basketball there. In both 1942–43 and 1946–47, he led the Longhorns to the NCAA Final Four, where they would lose to eventual national champion Wyoming and win the third-place game over CCNY, respectively. In each of those two seasons he was named All-Southwest Conference and, in 1947, a consensus Second Team All-American. After the 1943 season, Hargis enlisted in the United States military and fought in World War II for three years, then returned to Austin to finish college in 1947.

After school, Hargis played for the Anderson Packers for three seasons, then split time between the Fort Wayne Pistons and Tri-Cities Blackhawks during his fourth and final year as a professional. For the first two years, the Packers were a member of the NBL. In 1949–50, however, they merged into the NBA. As a rookie in 1947–48, Hargis was second on the team in scoring (642 points; 10.9 ppg). In his second season, he scored 444 points (7.8 ppg), and then in his final season with the Packers, Hargis averaged 10.7 ppg while scoring 643 points. In addition to moderate personal success, the Packers also won the NBL championship in Hargis' second year on the team.

In April 1948, Hargis played in final edition of the World Professional Basketball Tournament with the Packers (team finished in third place) and earned "second all-tournament team" honour after scoring 34 points in 3 games.

In April 1950, Hargis was drafted by the Fort Wayne Pistons from the Anderson Packers in a dispersal draft because their franchise had folded. After only playing in a handful of games for the Pistons, he was sold in December 1950 to the Tri-Cities Blackhawks. Hargis finished out the rest of the season with them but was not re-signed to any team and never played professionally again.

Career statistics

NBA
Source

Regular season

Playoffs

Notes
 Hargis' statistical totals only account for his two seasons in the NBA. They do not include his two years in the NBL.

References

1920 births
1986 deaths
All-American college men's basketball players
American men's basketball players
American military personnel of World War II
Anderson Packers players
Basketball players from Texas
Fort Wayne Pistons players
Forwards (basketball)
Guards (basketball)
People from Nacogdoches, Texas
Texas Longhorns men's basketball players
Tri-Cities Blackhawks players
Undrafted National Basketball Association players